Rumiyah was an online magazine used by the Islamic State (IS) for propaganda and recruitment. It was first published in September 2016 and was released in several languages, including English, French, German, Russian, Indonesian and Uyghur.

The magazine replaces Dabiq, Dar al-Islam and other magazines that were released until mid-2016. Analysts attributed the change of name partly to the imminent loss of the town of Dabiq to a Turkish-led military offensive, which occurred in October 2016.

The name Rumiyah (Rome) was a reference to a hadith in which Muhammed said that Muslims would conquer both Constantinople and Rome in that order.

Like Dabiq, each issue opens with a quote attributed to Abu Hamza al-Muhajir: "O muwahhidin, rejoice, for by Allah, we will not rest from our jihad except beneath the olive trees of Rumiyah (Rome)."

The first issue was released after the death of IS spokesman, Abu Mohammad al-Adnani, who was featured heavily in the magazine. In October 2016, Islamic State released the second edition of the magazine in which it justified attacks against non-Muslims, including detailed descriptions of how to carry out knife attacks on smaller groups of people.

In October 2016, Rumiyah advised followers to carry out stabbing attacks and argued that jihadists throughout Muslim history have "struck the necks of the kuffar" (unbelievers) in the name of Allah with "swords, severing limbs and piercing the fleshy meat of those who opposed Islam". The magazine advised its readers that knives are easy to obtain and to hide and that they make good, deadly weapons where Muslims might be regarded with suspicion.

Issues

See also
Dar al-Islam (magazine)
Konstantiniyye (magazine)
Dabiq (magazine)

References

Islamic State of Iraq and the Levant mass media
Arabic-language magazines
English-language magazines
Online magazines
Magazines established in 2016
Magazines published in Syria
Magazines disestablished in 2017
Defunct magazines published in Syria
Multilingual magazines
2016 establishments in Syria
2017 disestablishments in Syria
Propaganda newspapers and magazines
Indonesian-language magazines
Uyghur-language magazines
Bosnian-language magazines
Pashto-language magazines